Amy Ferguson is an American actress and model.  Ferguson is also a singer-songwriter who goes by the stage name of "Grandma Dirt."

Life and career
Ferguson was born in Cincinnati raised in southern Ohio. She attended Dr. John Hole Elementary School in Washington Township and graduated in 2000 from Alter High School in Kettering, Ohio. She opted to move to New York City rather than attend college, and signed with the Ford Modeling Agency. She worked as a model in Italy, France, Japan, and South Africa, and appeared in television commercials for AT&T and Intel.

Ferguson began focusing on acting and broke into film in 2004 with independent feature Garden State. She played Dana, a young woman who kisses star and director Zach Braff's character in a party scene. The part led to other film and television opportunities, including an audition for the film  Must Love Dogs starring Diane Lane. Ferguson appeared in the 2007 films Weapons, with Nick Cannon, and An American Crime, starring Elliot Page and Catherine Keener.

In 2009, Ferguson starred in Tanner Hall alongside Rooney Mara, Georgia King, and Brie Larson. The coming-of-age film, set in an all-girls  boarding school in New England, was directed by Tatiana von Fürstenberg and Francesca Gregorini. Ferguson had a supporting role in the independent comedy, Douchebag, directed by Drake Doremus, which premiered at the 2010 Sundance Film Festival. She had also appeared in the director's 2009 film, Spooner.

In 2012, Ferguson played a department store model in The Master, directed by Paul Thomas Anderson, and starring Philip Seymour Hoffman,  Joaquin Phoenix and Amy Adams. Ferguson appeared in Cold Turkey, with Peter Bogdanovich, Cheryl Hines and Alicia Witt. Set in Pasadena, California, the film looked at turmoil amidst an upper-class family's Thanksgiving get-together. She guest starred as Lily Anne on season 2 of the CW series, Hart of Dixie.

In 2016, Ferguson was cast as the lead, Inanna, in "Split," a film by Deborah Kampmeier.

Ferguson has also appeared in advertisements for American Eagle Outfitters.

Filmography

References

External links 
 
 
 

American film actresses
Living people
American television actresses
Actresses from Ohio
Female models from Ohio
1982 births
21st-century American women